Alaplı is a town and district of Zonguldak Province in the Black Sea region of Turkey. It has 2 municipalities, one is the centre and the other is named as "Gümeli". The mayor is Nuri Tekin (CHP).

Facts
Alaplı is situated at the mouth of the Alaplı River.  It is an ancient town known in the Hellenistic period as Kale. Also, there is a huge colosseum near Alapli Lake, used for lion-warrior fights for the ruler of the land itself.

This city is the hometown of the musician and guitarist Gurkan Zengin. Gurkan Zengin is now in a group called Mozaik, which works with singer, Tuğberk Isik, known for his performance for singing 'Kadinim' song.

There is a large statue of Mustafa Kemal Atatürk on the seafront at Alaplı.

References

External links
 

 
Populated places in Zonguldak Province
Fishing communities in Turkey
Populated coastal places in Turkey
Districts of Zonguldak Province